The Court of Quebec is a court of first instance in the Province of Quebec, Canada.

The court has jurisdiction over civil matters, criminal and penal matters as well as over youth matters  The court sits in administrative matters as well, and in appeal, on cases provided for by the law.

HistoryRaoul. P. Barbe, juge de la Cour du Québec à la retraite, Les palais de justice du Québec, Éditions Yvon Blais, 2013.
In 1998, upon the creation of the Administrative Tribunal of Quebec, the Expropriation Division of the Court of Quebec was abolished. Then in 2002, the Labour Court was replaced by the Quebec Labour Relations Board (Commission des relations du travail). Created in 2016, the Tribunal administratif du travail (the TAT) results from the merger of the Commission des lésions professionnelles  and the Commission des relations du travail. From then on, only penal matters of original jurisdiction, arising from offences under the Labour Code, came under the jurisdiction of the Court of Quebec's Criminal and Penal Division, and only the judges appointed by the chief judge had authority to rule upon these matters.

In 2005, as a result of decisions made by higher courts about the status of a "judge with limited jurisdiction," the Courts of Justice Act was amended to allow the appointment of justices of the peace. In addition to the six justices of the peace already in office since June 30, 2004, 27 new justices were appointed in 2005.

In 2013, the Court of Quebec celebrated its 25th anniversary. This event was highlighted in numerous magazines and newspapers including the Journal du Barreau of July and September 2013 and Le Monde juridique (Vol. 21, No. 7, Feb. 4, 2014).  Finally, a motion to mark this event was adopted unanimously by the National Assembly of Quebec on September 25, 2013.

JurisdictionCourt of Quebec, Public Report 2013, http://www.tribunaux.qc.ca/mjq_en/c-quebec/Communiques/CQ_Rapport2013an.pdf

Civil Division

Regular Division

The court's judges have jurisdiction, within the limits prescribed by law, over civil actions initiated under the Code of Civil Procedure or any other statute. The judges have authority to hear claims where the monetary value or interest of the matter in dispute is less than $85,000, except for support payment claims, claims related to residential leases that come under Régie du logement, and claims reserved for the Federal Court. The judges have the power to rule on municipal or school tax claims and to reverse or set aside municipal or school board assessment rolls.

Restricted license and vehicle release claims also fall under the jurisdiction of the judges under the Highway Safety Code.

The judges also hear actions requesting that someone undergo a psychiatric examination or be placed in institutional custody.

Small Claims Division

Judges in the Small Claims Division decide cases involving claims of no more than $15,000. The judges are also called upon to decide tax-related summary appeals.

Litigants are entitled to consult a lawyer to prepare their case. However, they must represent themselves at the hearing, i.e., they may not be assisted or represented by counsel, except when special permission is granted (e.g., in cases that raise complex legal questions).

Disputes are settled according to the same rules of law as those upheld by any court exercising jurisdiction in civil matters. However, the written procedure is simplified. At trial, the judges explain the rules of evidence and procedure to the parties. They direct the proceedings, question witnesses, hear the parties, and decide the issues in dispute. They provide each party with fair and impartial assistance, so as to render effective the substantive law and ensure that it is carried out. When circumstances allow, the judges endeavour to bring the parties to an agreement. The judgment is final and binding.

Administrative and Appeal Division

The judges of the Administrative and Appeal Division (AAD) have exclusive authority to hear appeals of decisions by various tribunals and administrative agencies, including Commission d'accès à l’information, the Administrative Tribunal of Quebec (particularly the real estate section), the Police Ethics Committee, and ethics committees governing professionals in matters of financial products and services distribution and real estate brokerage. AAD judges are also called to rule on highly complex taxation and tax recovery matters.

Criminal and Penal Division

The Court of Quebec has jurisdiction over any offence under federal or provincial law, whether penal, criminal, or regulatory in nature. The only exception is in trials before a court composed of a jury and a judge of a Superior Court.

The judges of the Court of Quebec preside over each step in the judicial process, from first appearance to imposition of the sentence, as the case may be. They are also very regularly called on to rule on applications for judicial authorization in the course of investigations (e.g., search warrants). The judges share this part of their jurisdiction with the presiding justices of the peace. To ensure the responsibility is properly assumed, presiding justices are available at all times, every day of the year, to analyze such applications.

Presiding justices of the peace preside over prosecutions under some 100 public welfare laws in areas as diverse as occupational health and safety, environmental protection, illegal practice of a profession, securities, and road safety.

Youth Division

Section 83 of the Courts of Justice Act establishes the jurisdiction of the Court of Quebec in youth matters.

Youth protection

The Court of Quebec hears cases relating to the Youth Protection Act. These cases concern children under the age of 18 whose safety or development is compromised according to the director of youth protection. If this proves to be the case, the judge will order that one or more measures provided for by law be taken and will determine their duration.

Any protection order may, under certain conditions, be extended or revised before it expires. In such cases, the application must be made to the judge who made the original order, unless this judge is prevented from doing so. This particularity of judges in the Youth Division is to ensure that they develop good knowledge of the child's situation. They are sometimes involved with a particular child for many years.

Adoption

The court has exclusive jurisdiction over all adoption applications, including international adoption.

Custody, emancipation, parental authority, and tutorship

The Court of Quebec has jurisdiction over certain family-related applications involving children who are already the subject of applications for protection or adoption. This is particularly the case for applications with regard to the custody or emancipation of a child or to settle a dispute concerning the exercise of parental authority over a child.

Criminal prosecution of adolescent youth

The court exercises jurisdiction over any youth over age 12 and under age 18 who is charged with committing a criminal offence. However, in certain exceptional circumstances it is possible that the trial may take place before a court composed of a Superior Court judge and a jury.

Penal prosecution of an adolescent youth

The Court of Quebec presides over the trials of youth charged with an offence under provincial law when they were between the ages of 14 and 18.

Composition

Judges in management positions

The Court of Quebec is made up of 308 judges and 36 presiding justices of the peace. The court has a management structure that assists the judges in the performance of their duties and functions. The Courts of Justice Act provides for the positions of chief judge, senior associate chief judge, and associate chief judges, whose mandates last seven years and cannot be renewed. The coordinating judges and associate coordinating judges complete this structure. Their mandates span a maximum of three years and can be renewed.

The chief judge and senior associate chief judge are the president and vice-president respectively of the Judicial Council of Quebec (Conseil de la magistrature du Québec). The associate chief judges are also members.

Current chief judges team

Chief judge

The chief judge ensures the general policies of the court are followed, coordinates and distributes the judges' work, promotes their professional development, and ensures compliance with the Judicial Code of Ethics. Under the Act, she is also tasked with assigning cases and scheduling the sittings of the court. On a daily basis, this responsibility is delegated to the Coordinating and associate coordinating judges in each region.

The chief judge is supported in her work by the team of judges in management positions. In cooperation with all the judges, whom she consults on a regular basis, the chief judge defines the Court's mission, values, and objectives. The chief judge represents the Court of Quebec and acts as its spokesperson with the government and other stake holders in the judicial system.

Chief judges from the establishment of the Court of Quebec in 1988

Senior associate chief judge

The senior associate chief judge assists and advises the chief judge in the performance of her duties and functions. He also oversees compliance with the court's policies and manages the scheduling and management-related professional development of the coordinating and associate coordinating judges. He chairs or sits on numerous committees, including those whose objective is to support court activities in the areas of technology, safety, and ethics. He conducts a periodic assessment of regional staffing needs and assignments and oversees the application of the per diem judge program.

Associate chief judges

The four associate chief judges advise the chief judge in matters for which they are responsible. They help the court achieve its objectives and establish its priorities and policies by recommending ways to improve its operations. They also support and assist judges with their daily tasks. At the request of the chief judge, the associate chief judges chair committees formed to select candidates for the position of judge.

The associate chief judge responsible for the municipal courts performs the duties and functions conferred under the Act respecting municipal courts. In collaboration with the municipal judges, he drafts general policies for them and monitors compliance. In addition, he ensures that judicial ethics are observed and oversees the professional development of the municipal judges. The municipal judges under his jurisdiction work in nearly 90 local and regional municipal courts serving nearly 900 municipalities across Quebec.

Coordinating and associate coordinating judges

With the government's approval, the chief judge designates a coordinating judge from among the court's judges for each of the court's ten coordinating regions. She can also designate a maximum of 12 associate coordinating judges. These judges represent the Court of Quebec in dealings with various parties in their respective regions. They are in charge of administering the court in the judicial district under their responsibility. This includes scheduling sittings of the court and assigning cases to judges. They help develop the court's priorities, policies, and practices, based in part on regional judges' expertise and the specific needs of their regions.

Each associate coordinating judge usually takes responsibility for a particular court division, under the authority of the coordinating judge. They work together to determine the needs of local judges and divide the workload across the region and with respect to the specific matters entrusted to them.

The coordinating and associate coordinating judges are also tasked with welcoming new judges. They are responsible for regional professional development programs.

Judges

The 319 Court of Quebec judges hear and decide cases involving civil, administrative and appellate, criminal and penal, and youth matters. Some judges hear cases involving only one of these matters, while others—particularly in the regions—hear cases in more than one division or area.

Presiding justices of the peace

In addition to the duties described above in the presentation of the Criminal and Penal Division, presiding justices of the peace sit in all courthouses and points of service to hear cases relating to Quebec legislation and a variety of federal statutes. In these matters, they have the same jurisdiction as Court of Quebec judges. Presiding justices of the peace preside over proceedings involving matters as varied and important as occupational health and safety, environmental protection, illegal practice of a profession, and securities.

The Courts of Justice Act was amended in 2012 to create a position of justice responsible for presiding justices of the peace.

Per diem judges

Some sixty per diem judges (i.e., retired judges who are authorized to exercise the judicial functions assigned to them by the chief judge) serve the Court on an ad hoc basis to assist it in fulfilling its mission. Per diem judges make a valuable contribution by helping the Court to minimize judicial delays.

Coordinating Regions

To make it easier to coordinate the court's activities, its territory is divided into 10 regions:

 Abitibi-Témiscamingue–Eeyou Istchee–Nunavik
 Bas-Saint-Laurent–Côte-Nord–Gaspésie–Îles-de-la-Madeleine
 Estrie
 Laval–Laurentides–Lanaudière–Labelle
 Mauricie–Bois-Francs–Centre-du-Québec
 Montérégie
 Montreal
 Outaouais
 Québec–Chaudière-Appalaches
 Saguenay–Lac-Saint-Jean

Judges also carry out their duties on a circuit court to serve Indigenous communities in northern Quebec and the Côte-Nord region.

External links 

 www.tribunaux.qc.ca/c-quebec/PetitesCreances/fs_PetitesCreances.html
 Courts of Justice Act 
 commemorative brochure
 Code of Civil Procedure
 Highway Safety Code.
 Judicial Council of Quebec

See also
Law in Quebec

References

External links
 Court of Quebec website
 list of judges

Quebec courts
Quebec
1988 establishments in Quebec
Courts and tribunals established in 1988